Majoun is a collaborative album between Sussan Deyhim and Richard Horowitz. The word Majoun means "Potion" in Persian and Arabic, and is an Egyptian delicacy, often containing hashish.

Track listing

Personnel 

Credits adapted from liner notes.

Musicians
 Sussan Deyhim – voice
 Richard Horowitz – keyboards
 Byron Wallen - trumpet
 Doug Wimbish - fretless bass
 Peter Freeman – overtone bass
 Steve Shehan - percussion, djembe
 Others

Technical personnel
 Sussan Deyhim – production
 Richard Horowitz – production
 Grace Row – executive production
 Anders Kalmark – programming
 Ray Staff - mastering
 Kerstin Bach – art direction
 Joseph Cultice – photography

References

External links 
 Majoun
 Majoun - rambles.net

1996 albums